Chandrakant Sitaram Pandit  (born 30 September 1961) is a former Indian cricketer who played in 5 Tests and 36 ODIs from 1986 to 1992. He was a   Wicket Keeper  Batsman     for    Indian national cricket team. He made his test debut against England at Headingley, Leeds on June 19, 1986, in the same match England wicket-keeper, Bruce French made his test debut. Eventually India won the series 2–0.

His ODI debut was against New Zealand at Sharjah in the Austral-Asia Cup on April 10, 1986. He was part of India's World Cup squad for the 1987 World Cup. He replaced Dilip Vengsarkar in the semi-final match against England at his hometown, Mumbai, and scored a brisk 24(30); however, India lost that match.

Coach 
After retirement, Pandit began a cricket academy at his alma mater, the Hansraj Morarji Public School. As a cricket coach, he enjoyed successful stints with several teams, including the Mumbai cricket team. He coached Vidarbha cricket team to two successive Ranji Trophy triumphs in 2018 and 2019. Under his coaching and tutelage, the Madhya Pradesh team won its very first Ranji Trophy in 2022. In 2022, Pandit was appointed as Head Coach for the IPL Franchise Kolkata Knight Riders.

Chairman 
He was the Chairman of All India Junior Selection Committee for the year 2013 and was replaced by Connor Williams.

References

India Test cricketers
India One Day International cricketers
Indian cricketers
West Zone cricketers
East Zone cricketers
Madhya Pradesh cricketers
Mumbai cricketers
Assam cricketers
Central Zone cricketers
Cricketers at the 1987 Cricket World Cup
1961 births
Living people
Cricketers from Mumbai
Indian cricket coaches
Wicket-keepers